Slink was an online magazine published by the BBC for teenage girls. The health articles on the site were written by Dr Mel, a regular contributor to BBC Radio 1's The Sunday Surgery and Top of the Pops magazine.  Slink was created by members of BBC Switch. On 15 May 2011, the Slink website was closed.

References

External links

BBC New Media
Online magazines published in the United Kingdom
British women's websites
Defunct women's magazines published in the United Kingdom
Magazines with year of establishment missing
Magazines disestablished in 2011
Teen magazines